Calliostoma belauense is a species of sea snail, a marine gastropod mollusk in the family Calliostomatidae.

Some authors place this taxon in the subgenus Calliostoma (Fautor)

Description

Distribution
This species occurs in the Pacific Ocean off the Palau Islands.

References

 Okutani, T. & Kurata, Y., 1998. An unusual molluscan assemblage containing Perotrochus africanus teramachii on the insular shelf of Palau Islands. Venus 57(1):11–16

External links
 

belauense
Gastropods described in 1998
Molluscs of the Pacific Ocean